Family Sayings (Original title Lessico famigliare) is a novel by the Italian author Natalia Ginzburg, first published in 1963. The book, which has also been published in English under the titles The Things We Used to Say and Family Lexicon, is a semi-biographical description of aspects of the daily life of her family, dominated by her father, the renowned histologist, Giuseppe Levi. The book is both an ironic and affectionate chronicle of life in the period 1920-1950, portrayed in terms of habits, behavior and, above all, linguistic communications, from which the book takes its title. People and events are brought to life by what they do and what they say. In addition to family members, including her mother, father, brothers and sisters the book also describes many friends and acquaintances.

The book covers the period of fascism in Italy and the early post-war years. It describes the death in custody of her husband Leone Ginzburg, a noted anti-fascist, and the persecution of the Jews in Italy during the period of Benito Mussolini. It ends with the suicide of the writer Cesare Pavese in 1950 and disillusionment at the failure to achieve the aims of the war-time resistance movement.

The novel won the Strega Prize in 1963.

Published versions

English translations

20th-century Italian novels
1963 novels
Strega Prize-winning works